Anastasia Gubanova may refer to:
Anastasia Gubanova (singles skater) (also known as Anastasiia Gubanova; born 2002), Russian figure skater competing in ladies' singles
Anastasia Gubanova (pair skater) (born 2000), Russian figure skater competing in pairs